Perttula is a rural village along the Lopentie road in Nurmijärvi, Finland. Living is focused to agriculture. It's rounded neighboring villages like Uotila, Numlahti, Valkjärvi and Nummenpää. Nurmijärvi's largest village Klaukkala is located eight kilometers southeast of Perttula.

Like a lake who gave the municipality its name, there was another lake near the Perttula village called Kuhajärvi, which was also drained in the early 20th century.

Swedish-Finnish composer Bernhard Crusell lived in part of his childhood in Perttula.

See also
Kuhakoski
Nurmijärvi (village)
Perttula executions

References

Villages in Finland
Nurmijärvi